Gaunkharka may refer to:

Gaunkharka, Dhading, Nepal
Gaunkharka, Nuwakot, Nepal